Igarka is a town in Turukhansky District of Krasnoyarsk Krai, Russia, located  north of the Arctic Circle. Igarka is a monotown established around a sawmill which processed timber logged in the basin of the Yenisei River for export. Up to 1956, it was largely inhabited by deportees and political prisoners.

History
Igarka was founded in 1929 as a sawmill and a timber-exporting port by the Chief Directorate of the Northern Sea Route. Timber was logged in the basin of the Yenisei River, floated to Igarka where it was processed, and then exported to various distribution centers. The town grew rapidly as deportees during the dekulakization campaigns were sent to the town. Igarka was granted city status in 1931. The town's construction was directed by  who envisioned Igarka as an ideal Soviet Arctic city. In 1939, the town reached its peak population of 23,648. Further development was suspended due to World War II, but resumed in the late 1940s when Igarka was envisioned as a naval port.

From 1949 to 1953, the Salekhard–Igarka Railway project made an unsuccessful attempt to connect Igarka to the Russian railway network at Salekhard, claiming the lives of thousands of Gulag prisoners. During the deportations of 1948–1951, thousands of civilians were deported to Igarka from the newly occupied territories of the Soviet Union. Some 6,000 to 10,000 Lithuanians were deported during the Operation Spring in May 1948 alone. About 1,000–3,000 of them died from the cold and poor conditions in the first year.

After the death of Stalin in 1953, the Salekhard–Igarka Railway project was abandoned and many deportees were allowed to return home. However, the town recovered and by 1965 it was the second largest lumber-exporting port in the Soviet Union. During this era, the town saw construction of typical concrete housing blocks. After the dissolution of the Soviet Union in 1991, the sawmill was not viable in the new free-market environment due to the high costs associated with the harsh climate conditions and long distances to the buyers. The sawmill closed in 2000 leading to the rapid decline in the town's population. Increasing mean annual air temperatures led to permafrost thaw which destabilized and structurally impaired many buildings in the town. To reduce maintenance and utility costs of such buildings, the town demolished and controlled burned the historic district of mainly wooden houses in the mid-2000s. The residents were relocated to the newer apartment blocks.

Geography

Climate
Igarka has a subarctic climate (Köppen climate classification: Dfc)

Demographics
Population: 4,417 (2019);    16,000 (1970); 14,311 (1959); 23,649 (1939). Igarka is a monotown, a town whose economy is dominated by a single industry. Its population rapidly declined after the dissolution of the Soviet Union and after the closure of the main sawmill in 2000.

Before the collapse of the Soviet Union, the town was predominantly populated by Lithuanians, Germans, Russians, Tatars and Poles. When the Soviet Union fell apart many of these people returned to their respective countries, turning the entire area into an entirely Slavic one populated by Russians, Ukrainians and Belarusians.

Administrative and municipal status
Within the framework of administrative divisions, it is incorporated within Turukhansky District as the district town of Igarka. As a municipal division, the district town of Igarka is incorporated within Turukhansky Municipal District as Igarka Urban Settlement.

Transportation
The town is located north of the Arctic Circle and is built on permafrost. Though it is situated inland, Igarka is a deep water port situated on the east bank of the Yenisei River and provides access to the Northern Sea Route.

It is served by Igarka Airport, whose location on an island in the middle of the river makes access difficult when the water is partly thawed: in winter one can drive across, and in summer there is a boat connection, but in between those seasons crossing is difficult.

Culture
The town's main attraction is a permafrost museum which has won some pan-European prizes. The museum is located in the former geocryological lab founded in 1930 by the Siberian Branch of the Academy of Sciences of the Soviet Union. A year later, an underground permafrost research station was established. Several shafts were excavated by hand in late 1930s and early 1940s extending as far as 14 meters into the permafrost. Research in these facilities led to the development of building foundations specifically adapted to the permafrost.

Notable people
 

Oleh Polischuk (born 1991), professional footballer

References

Notes

Sources

External links

Official website of Igarka 
Igarka Business Directory 

Cities and towns in Krasnoyarsk Krai
Cities and towns built in the Soviet Union
Populated places established in 1929
Populated places of Arctic Russia
Turukhansky District
Road-inaccessible communities of Krasnoyarsk Krai
Populated places on the Yenisei River